Peter Grigg was an Australian rugby union winger who played at the 1987 Rugby World Cup, he played in 5 matches.
He was born in Herberton on 20 July 1958 and grew up in Ravenshoe, Queensland, playing Rugby League for Millaa Millaa as a boy. He played 25 tests from 1980 to 1987 with his last test match being against Wales in the third place playoff. In his career, he scored 12 tries for the Wallabies.

1987 Rugby World Cup

Peter Grigg played in the pool games against England and Japan, scoring a try in the 42–23 win over Japan. He scored another try against Wales in the third place playoff in what was his last game for the Wallabies. He was aged 28 at this World Cup.

References

www.espnscrum.com/statsguru/rugby/player/9221.html

Australian rugby union players
1958 births
Living people
Australia international rugby union players
Rugby union players from Queensland
Rugby union wings